Boothferry Bridge is a crossing over the River Ouse, between the East Riding and West Yorkshire, England, some  north-west of Goole. The bridge was opened in 1929, replacing a ferry crossing immediately west of the bridge's location. The Act of Parliament for the building of the bridge in 1925, gave priority to river traffic. This situation still exists, though there have been some attempts to change priorities. The M62 Ouse Bridge opened up to the east of Boothferry Bridge in 1976.

History
The bridge at Boothferry was built to replace the ferry which connected the hamlet of Booth with the south side of the Ouse. The ferry was owned by the Bishops of Durham and Ripon, having been in operation since at least 1513, but was leased to several operators before the bridge was built. An Act of Parliament was granted in 1925 providing authority to construct the bridge and giving priority to river traffic. An attempt was made in the 1980s to rescind the priority for river traffic. Construction began in January 1926, with the bridge opening in July 1929, becoming the furthest bridge over the River Ouse. The journey from Hull to London was shortened by  helping travellers to avoid going over the toll bridge at Selby. This continued until 1976, when the Ouse Bridge of the M62 opened, and then, in 1981, the Humber Bridge was opened.

The construction was funded by five public bodies, the Ministry of Transport (£56,000), West Riding County Council (£33,600), East Riding County Council (£5,600), Hull City Council (£11,200), and Goole Urban District Council (£5,600), at a total cost of £112,000. However, by the time the bridge opened in July 1929, the bridge had cost £116,467, and the approach roads had cost £72,000.

Engineering of the bridge was carried out by Cleveland Bridge, to a design by the firm of Mott, Hay & Anderson. Barges were able to be towed up river past this point two abreast (lashed together), until they reached Selby.

Almost immediately to the east of Boothferry Bridge is the Ouse Bridge, which was opened in May 1976, and carries the M62 over the River Ouse. In the 1960s, before the M62 bridge was built, consideration was given to re-using an abandoned railway bridge over the River Ouse at Long Drax (from the Hull and Barnsley Railway), in an effort to alleviate the traffic flow over Boothferry Bridge. A major repair of the bridge was undertaken in 1979, when £1 million was spent on renovation works. On days when the bridge was closed completely to vehicular traffic, diversions were in  place via the M62 bridge, but those that couldn't use the motorway (such as pedestrians) were taken on buses along the M62. It was renovated and repaired again, in 2021, at a cost of £2.2 million.

The bridge is the western limit of the Humber Estuary Special Area of Conservation.

Popular culture
In 1972, a folk group, The Lonesome Travellers, recorded a song about the bridge.

References

External links

Boothferry Bridge on goole.uk.net
Images of the Boothferry and Ouse Bridges showing their proximity

Bridges across the River Ouse, Yorkshire
Bridges completed in 1929
Bridges in the East Riding of Yorkshire
Road bridges in England
1929 establishments in England
Selby